The Zhongnan University of Economics and Law (ZUEL) is a public university in Wuhan, China. The university is funded by the Ministry of Education. 

ZUEL was established in 2000 with the merge of Central South University of Finance and Economics and Central South Institute of Law. Its root could be traced to 1948 when Zhongyuan University was founded in the Province of Henan and later moved to Wuhan.

Renowned as a leading institution of China in economics, finance, statistics, management, and law, ZUEL is designated as one of the national key universities funded by the Double First Class University Plan and former Project 211. In 2018, it was selected in the Plan 111. As of 2022, Zhongnan University of Economics and Law ranked # 1 in the South Central China region and top 4 nationwide among all universities specialized in finance, business, and economics in the Best Chinese Universities Ranking.

History 
The Zhongnan University of Economics and Law was founded in 1948 as Zhongyuan University, whose financial department later merged with the economic and financial departments from Wuhan University, Sun Yat-sen University, etc.

To form the Central South Institute of Finance (later it became the Central South University of Finance and Economics) and whose law department merged with other schools' to form the Central South Institute of Law. The two universities were subsequently merged and separated throughout the Cultural Revolution and finally merged again to form the university today.

Academics 

The Zhongnan University of Economics and Law comprises 19 schools, 51 undergraduate programs, 104 master programs, 57 doctoral programs, 6 post-doctoral programs, 1 key research base of humanities at the state level, 4 key disciplines at the state level, 10 key research bases of humanities at the provincial level, 19 key disciplines at the ministerial and provincial level. 

Zhongnan University of Economics and Law has a high-level research faculty of over 2,660 full-time teaching and administrative staff, including 219 professors, 500 associate professors, and 160 doctoral supervisors. It is "authorized to award MBA, EMBA, JM, MPAcc, MPA, ME (Master of Education) degrees, and enrolls students from overseas as well as from Taiwan, Hong Kong, and Macao".  The MBA program of this university was accredited by the Association of MBAs.

The Zhongnan University of Economics and Law enrolls over 20,000 full-time undergraduates, 6,000 postgraduate students, 900 doctoral students and post-doctoral students, over 9,000 adult students, and 400 international students.

The "Zhongnan University of Economics and Law has a group of learned scholars who have prestige in the academic world of management, economics, and law, both at home and abroad. More than 45 professors are sponsored by the State Council of China, and more than 65 professors have been awarded the title of Young Experts of Hubei Province with Prominent Contributions to the Country with expert allowance. In the past 25 years, the faculty has accomplished over 400 items of key research projects at the state and provincial level. Among which, 100 items were the projects of the State Social Science Fund, the State Natural Science Fund, and the key project of the Ministry of Education, 187 of these being the key projects were sponsored by the Ministry of Finance and the Ministry of Justice. The faculty has made over 30,000 research contributions, including more than 1,300 monographs, more than 1,700 textbooks, and more than 21,000 articles, with more than 500 publications in foreign countries."

Constituent Schools 

School of Marxism
School of Philosophy
Economics School
School of Public Finance and Taxation
School of Finance
Law School
Criminal Justice School
School of Foreign Languages
School of Journalism and Mass Communication
School of Business Administration
School of Accounting
School of Public Administration
School of Statistics and Mathematics
School of Information and Safety Engineering
Wenlan School of Business
School of Intellectual Property Rights
MBA School
School of Continuing Education(School of Network Education)
China and South Korea School of New Media
School of International Education

Campus 
The campus of Zhongnan University of Economics and Law "covers an area of over 210 hectares, and has a combined floor space of 800,000 square meters". "The university library has a collection of over 2.5 million volumes, possessing the national and global information retrieval system and offering its students ready access to the cyber world. In addition, it has 8 modern stadiums, two of which were used as the major sports field for the National University Games, the National Series-A Football Match, the Finals of College Men’s Soccer Tournament of China, as well as the East Asia College Soccer Match. It has two state-of-the-art auditoriums and over 30 apartment buildings that are used as student dormitories. Beautiful and spacious, ZUEL campuses are decorated with lakes, trees, grass and flowers."

Rankings and reputation 
As of 2022, Zhongnan University of Economics and Law ranked # 1 in the South Central China region and top 4 nationwide (the only university outside Beijing and Shanghai) among all universities specialized in finance, business, and economics in the Best Chinese Universities Ranking. Internationally, Zhongnan University of Economics and Law has been ranked among the top # 500 universities worldwide for "Economics" and "Management".

International Education

"In the fields of international academic exchange, Zhongnan University of Economics and Law has developed a worldwide cooperative research and academic exchange relationships with universities and research institutions of more than 20 countries and regions in Asia, Europe, America, and Australia. Zhongnan University of Economics and Law is open to all educators, scholars, and students from all over the world. Since the 1950s, Zhongnan University of Economics and Law have nurtured many international students. In the past 58 years, Zhongnan University of Economics and Law has cultivated more than 200,000 students and has made great contribution to the development of China."

References

External links
Official website of Zhongnan University of Economics and Law
School & Faculty
Brief Introduction of Zhongnan University of Economics and Law
Campus Map 

 
Educational institutions established in 1948
Universities and colleges in Wuhan
Economics schools
Law schools in China
Business schools in China
1948 establishments in China